Terminal  is a neighbourhood (barrio) of Asunción, Paraguay. Its name is given by the fact that the Terminal de Ómnibus de Asunción, the city's main coach terminal, is located in this neighbourhood.

Neighbourhoods of Asunción